The Cole–Hasbrouck Farm Historic District is a historic home and farm and national historic district located along NY 32 north of the junction with US 44 and NY 55 at Modena, Ulster County, New York, USA. The district encompasses 21 contributing buildings, 4 contributing sites, and 5 contributing structures on a farm established in the 1820s.  The main house was built about 1820, and is a two-story, five bay, brick and stone dwelling with a side gable roof.  It has a two-story rear frame ell that subsumes and earlier 1 1/2-story kitchen ell.  Other contributing resources are related to the house landscape and dependencies, the farm complex, and a hamlet that grew in the 1850s at the crossroads.

It was added to the National Register of Historic Places in 1994.

References

National Register of Historic Places in Ulster County, New York
Farms on the National Register of Historic Places in New York (state)
Historic districts in Ulster County, New York
Plattekill, New York
Historic districts on the National Register of Historic Places in New York (state)